Marcelo Elgarten (born 9 November 1974), commonly known as Marcelinho is a former Brazilian volleyball player. He won a silver medal at the 2008 Summer Olympics.

Elgarten was born in Rio de Janeiro, and is Jewish.

Individual awards
 2007 Pan-American Games "Best Setter"
 ''Men's World Cup 2007; Rated 3rd best setter.

See also
 List of notable Jewish volleyball players

References

External links
 Men's best setters 2007

1974 births
Living people
Brazilian men's volleyball players
Volleyball players at the 2007 Pan American Games
Volleyball players at the 2008 Summer Olympics
Olympic volleyball players of Brazil
Olympic silver medalists for Brazil
Brazilian Jews
Brazilian people of German descent
Olympic medalists in volleyball
Medalists at the 2008 Summer Olympics
Panathinaikos V.C. players
Pan American Games gold medalists for Brazil
Pan American Games medalists in volleyball
Medalists at the 2007 Pan American Games
Setters (volleyball)
Volleyball players from Rio de Janeiro (city)